Pterothysanus laticilia is a moth of the  family Callidulidae. It is found in south-east Asia, including India.

References

External links
Museum Witt: images of Pterothysanus laticilia

Callidulidae
Moths described in 1854
Moths of Asia